Dolophrosyne is a genus of moths of the family Notodontidae. It consists of the following species:
Dolophrosyne coniades  (Druce, 1893) 
Dolophrosyne elongata  (Hering, 1925) 
Dolophrosyne mirax  Prout, 1918
Dolophrosyne sinuosa  Miller, 2008

Notodontidae of South America